The 2014 History 300 was the 11th stock car race of the 2014 NASCAR Nationwide Series season, and the 33rd iteration of the event. The race was held on Saturday, May 24, 2014, in Concord, North Carolina at Charlotte Motor Speedway, a 1.5 miles (2.4 km) permanent quad-oval. The race took the scheduled 200 laps to complete. Turner Scott Motorsports driver Kyle Larson would manage to dominate the late stages of the race to take his second career NASCAR Nationwide Series victory and his second and final victory of the season. To fill out the podium, Team Penske driver Brad Keselowski and Joe Gibbs Racing driver Kyle Busch would finish second and third, respectively.

Background 

The race was held at Charlotte Motor Speedway, located in Concord, North Carolina. The speedway complex includes a 1.5-mile (2.4 km) quad-oval track that was utilized for the race, as well as a dragstrip and a dirt track. The speedway was built in 1959 by Bruton Smith and is considered the home track for NASCAR with many race teams based in the Charlotte metropolitan area. The track is owned and operated by Speedway Motorsports Inc. (SMI) with Marcus G. Smith serving as track president.

Entry list 

 (R) denotes rookie driver.
 (i) denotes driver who is ineligible for series driver points.

Practice

First practice 
The first practice session was held on Thursday, May 22, at 4:00 PM EST. The session would last for one hour.

Final practice 
The final practice session, sometimes referred to as Happy Hour, was held on Thursday, May 22, at 5:30 PM EST. The session would last for one hour and 20 minutes.

Qualifying 
Qualifying was held on Saturday, May 24, at 10:40 AM EST. Since Talladega Superspeedway is at least  in length, the qualifying system was a multi-car system that included three rounds. The first round was 25 minutes, where every driver would be able to set a lap within the 25 minutes. Then, the second round would consist of the fastest 24 cars in Round 1, and drivers would have 10 minutes to set a lap. Round 3 consisted of the fastest 12 drivers from Round 2, and the drivers would have 5 minutes to set a time. Whoever was fastest in Round 3 would win the pole.

No drivers would fail to qualify.

Full qualifying results 

*Time not available.

Race results

Standings after the race 

Drivers' Championship standings

Note: Only the first 10 positions are included for the driver standings.

References 

2014 NASCAR Nationwide Series
NASCAR races at Charlotte Motor Speedway
May 2014 sports events in the United States
2014 in sports in North Carolina